"There You Are" is a song written by Ed Hill, Mark D. Sanders and Bob DiPiero, and recorded by American country music artist Martina McBride. It was released in May 2000 as the third single from her album Emotion.  The song was McBride's twelfth Top 10 hit on the U.S. Billboard Hot Country Singles & Tracks, and was her first Top 20 hit on the U.S. Adult Contemporary charts.

In 2001, it was included as a track on McBride's Greatest Hits album.

Chart performance
"There You Are" re-entered the chart as a single at number 67 on the U.S. Billboard Hot Country Singles & Tracks for the week of May 20, 2000.

Year-end charts

Notes

References

2000 singles
1999 songs
Martina McBride songs
Songs written by Bob DiPiero
Songs written by Mark D. Sanders
Song recordings produced by Paul Worley
RCA Records Nashville singles
Songs written by Ed Hill